The Engagement of St Ursula and Prince Etherius (also known as Marriage of St. Ursula and Prince Conan) is a panel from the Saint Auta Altarpiece commissioned in 1522 by Eleanor, Queen of Portugal for the Convent of Madre de Deus, Lisbon. It features a group of African musicians at the Portuguese court.

The painting is in the National Museum of Ancient Art in Lisbon.

References

16th century in Portugal
Portuguese art